"Nový obzory" is a single by the Czech pop music group Slza. The music was created by Lukáš Bundil and Dalibor Cidlinský Jr. and the text was composed by Xindl X.

Music video 
A music video was recorded for the single on June 28 and June 29, 2018 in the Klecany studios. The main character of the music video is Martin Novák, as he goes through his youth.

References

External links 
 Official website of Slza
 Nový obzory on Spotify

Slza songs
2018 songs
2018 singles
Universal Music Group singles
Songs written by Xindl X